Bulletin of the International Statistical Institute (Bulletin de l'Institut international de statistique) is a journal published with the proceedings of the biennial meeting of the International Statistical Institute. It first appeared in 1886.

References 

Statistics journals
Biennial journals